"The Thing to Do" is an R&B song by Glenn Lewis. It is his debut single, released in 1997, and is featured on the GROOVEssentials Volume One compilation album. The song was nominated for Best R&B/Soul Recording at the 1998 Juno Awards.

Music video
The song's music video features an appearance by a young Melyssa Ford.

References

 

1997 debut singles
Glenn Lewis songs
1997 songs
Songs written by Glenn Lewis